The Swimming competition at the XVI Pan American Games was October 15–22, 2011 at the Scotiabank Aquatics Center in Guadalajara, Mexico. The open water events swam in the waters off API Maritime Terminal in Puerto Vallarta.

Participating countries
274 athletes from 36 countries were entered in Swimming and Open Water events at the Games (note: 13 countries were entered in Open Water, but all those countries were also entered in pool events as well):

Benjamin Hockin gave Paraguay its first medal in the history of swimming at the Pan American Games, a bronze in the men's 200m freestyle.

Event schedule
The Amateur Swimming Union of the Americas (ASUA) originally proposed an 8-day format for the Games, mimicking the Olympic order format with prelims/semifinals/finals. However, this was changed in June 2010 at the bequest of the local organizers to a 7-day format, changing to a prelims/finals only (with A&B finals). The shortening was to allow for the Open Water races, which were the day following the Swimming competition, to move from Sunday, October 23, 2011 to Saturday, October 22 in Puerto Vallarta. As part of the formatting change, the men's 1500 free and women's 800 free were also moved from the last two days of the schedule to earlier in the program to distance them from the open water swim.

Results

Men

* Swimmers who participated in the heats only and received medals.

Women's events

* Swimmers who swam in preliminary heats and received medals.

Medal standings

Qualifying
On May 26, 2010 the qualification standards for the Swimming portion of the 2011 Pan Am Games were set.
a B standard which qualifies up to one swimmer per event, or 
an A standard which qualifies up to two swimmers per event, where both swimmers must meet this faster standard.

The time standards for the 2011 Pan American Games were:

References

 
Events at the 2011 Pan American Games
Pan American Games
Swimming at the Pan American Games
International aquatics competitions hosted by Mexico
Swimming competitions in Mexico